Andrei Vladimirovich Salnikov (born 13 March 1982) is a former Russian professional footballer.

External links
 

1982 births
People from Murom
Living people
Russian footballers
Russian Premier League players
Russian expatriate footballers
Expatriate footballers in Kazakhstan
FC Ural Yekaterinburg players
FC Kuban Krasnodar players
PFC Spartak Nalchik players
FC Lada-Tolyatti players
FC Chernomorets Novorossiysk players
Russian expatriate sportspeople in Kazakhstan
FC Nizhny Novgorod (2007) players
FC Baltika Kaliningrad players
FC Zvezda Irkutsk players
FC Fakel Voronezh players
Association football forwards
FC Torpedo Moscow players
FC Dynamo Bryansk players
FC Ordabasy players
FC Zhetysu players
Sportspeople from Vladimir Oblast